Kamala Niketan Montessori School (KNMS) is a school located in Tiruchirappalli, Tamil Nadu, India.

History
KNMS began with the foundation of "Tiny Tots", a play school for children by Mrs. Geetanjali Satyamoorthy. In 2008, the school started its third block. By 2009, KNMS Institution proposed a site for some more blocks. Temporary classes were built around the smaller ground. Students are now being moved from the old block to the new building. Students of class 4 to 12 have been shifted to the new building.

In 2005, it became the first school in Tiruchirappalli to initiate the fun based visual learning technology called Educomp. In 2010, it began its course from Extramarks.It now is having about 4,020 students studying in it
..
It get accredited to CBSE from 2000.

External links

References
..

Montessori schools in India
Primary schools in Tamil Nadu
High schools and secondary schools in Tamil Nadu
Schools in Tiruchirappalli
Educational institutions established in 1991
1991 establishments in Tamil Nadu